DnaJ homolog subfamily C member 2 is a protein that in humans is encoded by the DNAJC2 gene.

This gene is a member of the M-phase phosphoprotein (MPP) family. The gene encodes a phosphoprotein with a J domain and a Myb DNA-binding domain which localizes to both the nucleus and the cytosol. The protein is capable of forming a heterodimeric complex that associates with ribosomes, acting as a molecular chaperone for nascent polypeptide chains as they exit the ribosome. This protein was identified as a leukemia-associated antigen and expression of the gene is upregulated in leukemic blasts. Also, chromosomal aberrations involving this gene are associated with primary head and neck squamous cell tumors. This gene has a pseudogene on chromosome 6. Alternatively spliced variants which encode different protein isoforms have been described; however, not all variants have been fully characterized.

References

Further reading